Malcolm Richard Wilkey (December 6, 1918 – August 15, 2009) was a United States circuit judge of the United States Court of Appeals for the District of Columbia Circuit and United States Ambassador to Uruguay.

Early life and education

Wilkey was born in Murfreesboro, Tennessee and raised in Madisonville, Kentucky. He received an Artium Baccalaureus degree from Harvard University in 1940, and served in the United States Army during World War II in George S. Patton's Third Army from 1941 to 1945 (he left active duty as a Major and served in the United States Army Reserve until 1953, when he left as a Lieutenant Colonel). After the war he enrolled in law school and received a Bachelor of Laws from Harvard Law School in 1948.

Career

Early career

 
Wilkey was in private practice in Houston, Texas, from 1948 to 1954, also teaching at the University of Houston Law Center from 1949 to 1954. Wilkey entered public service in Texas as the United States Attorney for the Southern District of Texas (1954–1958). In 1958 he moved to Washington, D.C., to serve as the United States Assistant Attorney General of the Office of Legal Counsel at the United States Department of Justice (1958–1959), and Assistant Attorney General of the Criminal Division (1959–1961). He returned to private practice in Texas (1961–1963), before moving on to become the General counsel and secretary of Kennecott Copper Corporation (1963–1970), during which he was also a member of the Advisory Panel on International Law for the legal adviser at the United States Department of State (1969–1973).

Federal judicial service

Wilkey was nominated by President Richard Nixon on February 16, 1970, for the seat vacated by Judge Warren E. Burger on the United States Court of Appeals for the District of Columbia Circuit. He was confirmed by the United States Senate on February 24, 1970, and received his commission the following day. He assumed senior status on December 6, 1984, and his judicial service ended November 8, 1985, when he retired and went to Cambridge University as a visiting fellow of Wolfson College.

Political appointments

In 1989 he was chairman of the President's Commission on Federal Ethics Law Reform and worked alongside his Vice Chairman Griffin Bell, who was the United States Attorney General under President Jimmy Carter.

President Ronald Reagan appointed him United States Ambassador to Uruguay in 1985, and President George H. W. Bush continued him in that post until his retirement in 1990.

In 1992 United States Attorney General William P. Barr appointed him to determine whether federal criminal violations had taken place in the House banking scandal.

Personal life

Wilkey married Chilean-born Emma A. Secul Depolo in 1959. He and his wife moved to Santiago, Chile, in 1990. Wilkey died from complications of prostate cancer at his home in Santiago on August 15, 2009.

References

Writings

Further reading

External links
 
  
 

1918 births
2009 deaths
Ambassadors of the United States to Uruguay
American expatriates in Chile
United States Army personnel of World War II
Eisenhower administration personnel
Fellows of Wolfson College, Cambridge
Harvard Law School alumni
Judges of the United States Court of Appeals for the D.C. Circuit
People from Madisonville, Kentucky
People from Murfreesboro, Tennessee
Texas lawyers
Texas Republicans
United States Army officers
United States Assistant Attorneys General for the Criminal Division
United States Assistant Attorneys General for the Office of Legal Counsel
United States Attorneys for the Southern District of Texas
United States court of appeals judges appointed by Richard Nixon
20th-century American judges
University of Houston faculty